The 9th Guards Motor Rifle Division was a Soviet Army unit initially formed as a tank corps in April 1942. In the same year, it was then formed as a mechanized corps in November 1942. This unit then became a Guards mechanized corps in September 1944. Following World War II, the corps were reorganized as a mechanized division in 1945 and then a motor rifle division in 1957 before being disbanded in 1958.

History

World War II 
The unit formed as the 22nd Tank Corps on 3 April 1942 and was subordinated to the 38th and 4th Tank Armies of the Southwestern and Stalingrad Fronts. In September 1942, following heavy losses around Kalach, the corps moved into the Reserve of the Supreme High Command (Stavka reserve) and was reorganized as the second instance (formation) of the 5th Mechanized Corps. During 1943, the 5th Mechanized Corps was mainly assigned as a Stavka reserve asset or as a reserve of the Western Front. The corps was assigned to the 6th Tank Army in February 1944 and achieved Guards status on 12 September 1944, being retitled as the 9th Guards Mechanized Corps. As such, the corps remained with the 6th Guards Tank Army for the remainder of the war in Europe, and was then transferred with its parent army to the far east, seeing action against Japanese forces under the direction of the Transbaikal Front.

The corps was in combat near Kalach in 1942, Smolensk and Lenino in 1943, Korsun and Iasi-Kishinev in 1944, and at Budapest and Vienna in 1945, as well as fighting in the Manchurian Operation in September 1945.

The 9th Guards Mechanized Corps was notable for its use of U.S. Lend-Lease M4A2 diesel-engined Sherman tanks during 1944-45.

Postwar 
In October 1945, the corps, like all Soviet mechanized corps, was reorganized into a division, the 9th Guards Mechanized Division. It was stationed at Yasnaya, part of the Transbaikal Military District's 6th Guards Tank Army. The division included the 18th, 30th, and 31st Guards Mechanized Regiments, and the 46th and 111th Guards Tank Regiments. On 4 June 1957, the division became the 9th Guards Motor Rifle Division at Sainshand, Mongolia. The division was disbanded on 1 November 1958.

References

Erickson, John. The Road to Stalingrad, Yale University Press, 1995

Glantz, David, Companion to Colossus Reborn, University Press of Kansas, 2005.
Poirier, Robert G., and Conner, Albert Z., The Red Army Order of Battle in the Great Patriotic War, Presidio Press, 1985.

G009
Military units and formations established in 1942
Military units and formations disestablished in 1958